Inqilab is a major daily newspaper in Bangladesh, published from Dhaka in the Bengali language.

Controversies

Allegations of Indian troops presence 
In 2014, during clashes in Satkhira Inqilab reported that Indian forces had been deployed in Satkhira to quell the protestors. The report detailed an alleged fax, dated 6 November 2013, from the between foreign ministry in Dhaka and the Bangladesh high commission in Delhi, requesting Indian troop presence in Satkhira. Titled "Military Aid from India and Deployment at Satkhira" the alleged fax and the e-mail name real people with their designations. The body of the fax refers to a letter received from Brigadier General Noor Md. Noor Islam, presumably seeking information on purported suggestions from the Prime Minister's office. The document suggested that the Indian Army's 33rd Corps West Bengal, consisting of the 17th, 20th, and 27th Mountain Division. Four different categories are listed for the nature of the deployment - Rapid, Armoured, Artillery, and Signal and Engineering. However, at the time the fax was sent, only the first, Rapid, is confirmed, while the rest were not confirmed. According to the fax, the number of personnel to be deployed is to be agreed with the Jessore GOC of the Bangladesh Army. The fax also mentioned "Transfer and Infiltration Channels" for Indian troops to Bangladesh to take part in the operation. This included the Bhomra in Satkhira. Third, it listed he Assashuni and Satkhira Sadar police stations for hubs of intelligence and Jessore Cantonment was listed as an extra option. The fourth point specifies the "Areas of Engagement" for the Indian troop deployment. The areas of deployment were five out of the seven Upazilas that make up Satkhira - Shyamnagar, Debhata, Assasuni, Kalaroa and Satkhira Sadar.

According to The Daily Star, the alleged fax was circulating on Facebook and the Inquilab simply picked it up without verification.

Reactions 
The Ministry of Foreign Affairs vehemently denied the existence of the fax and dismissed the fax as fake. The three journalists including Robiulla Robi, the reporter, were arrested and the printing press of Inqilab was sealed. The Daily Star termed the report "a let down for journalism."

See also 
 List of newspapers in Bangladesh

References

External links 
 

Bengali-language newspapers published in Bangladesh
Daily newspapers published in Bangladesh
Newspapers published in Dhaka